Thomas Albert Delegal was an American politician. He served as a Democratic member of the Florida House of Representatives.

In 1943, Delegal was elected to the Florida House of Representatives. He left office in 1947.

References 

Year of birth missing
Year of death missing
Democratic Party members of the Florida House of Representatives
20th-century American politicians